TestDisk is a free and open-source data recovery utility that helps users recover lost partitions or repair corrupted filesystems. TestDisk can collect detailed information about a corrupted drive, which can then be sent to a technician for further analysis. TestDisk supports DOS, Microsoft Windows (i.e. NT 4.0, 2000, XP, Server 2003, Server 2008, Vista, Windows 7, Windows 8.1, Windows 10), Linux, FreeBSD, NetBSD, OpenBSD, SunOS, and MacOS. TestDisk handles non-partitioned and partitioned media. In particular, it recognizes the GUID Partition Table (GPT), Apple partition map, PC/Intel BIOS partition tables, Sun Solaris slice and Xbox fixed partitioning scheme. TestDisk uses a command line user interface. TestDisk can recover deleted files with 97% accuracy.

Features
TestDisk can recover deleted partitions, rebuild partition tables or rewrite the master boot record (MBR).

Partition recovery
TestDisk retrieves the LBA size and CHS geometry of attached data storage devices (i.e. hard disks, memory cards, USB flash drives, and virtual disk images) from the BIOS or the operating system. The geometry information is required for a successful recovery. TestDisk reads sectors on the storage device to determine if the partition table or filesystem on it requires repair. TestDisk can perform deeper checks to locate partitions that have been deleted from a storage device or disk image. However, it is up to the user to look over the list of possible partitions found by TestDisk and to select those that they wish to recover.

Filesystem repair
TestDisk can deal with some specific logical filesystem corruption.

File recovery
When a file is deleted, the list of disk clusters occupied by the file is erased, marking those sectors available for use by other files created or modified thereafter. TestDisk can recover deleted files especially if the file was not fragmented and the clusters have not been reused.

Digital forensics
TestDisk can be used in digital forensics to retrieve partitions that were deleted long ago. It can mount various types of disk images including the Expert Witness File Format used by EnCase. Binary disk images, such as those created with ddrescue can be read by TestDisk as though it were a storage device. In TestDisk versions prior to version 7, this feature could be exploited to inject malicious code into a running TestDisk application on Windows.

File system support
File system support for TestDisk is shown in the table:

See also

PhotoRec
List of data recovery software
List of free and open-source software packages

References

External links
 TestDisk Wiki
 List of news articles about TestDisk and PhotoRec
 Data Recovery With TestDisk, Falko Timme, HowtoForge
 Digital Forensics using Linux and Open Source Tools

Test Disk Team:
Main Contributor: Christophe Grenier. Location: Paris, France. URL: cgsecurity.org. He started the project in 1998 and is still the main developer. He is also responsible for the packaging of TestDisk & PhotoRec for DOS, Windows, Linux (generic version), MacOS X, and Fedora distribution.

Cross-platform software
Free data recovery software
Free partitioning software
Free software programmed in C
Free system software
Hard disk software
Portable software
Software using the GPL license